Box TV may refer to:
CRT television, a thick built television set, now largely obsolete, in contrast to a flat screen television.
Box TV Limited, a UK-based production company specialising in film and television drama
Box Television, formerly Video Jukebox Network International Limited, a British television company